POET LLC is a U.S. biofuel company that specializes in the creation of bioethanol. The privately held corporation, which was originally called Broin Companies, is headquartered in Sioux Falls, South Dakota. In 2007, the Renewable Fuels Association named POET the largest U.S. ethanol producer, creating  of fuel per year. POET currently produces 3 billion gallons of ethanol per year, or 19% of all ethanol produced in the United States.

POET operates 33 ethanol plants spread across Indiana, Iowa, Michigan, Missouri, Ohio, Minnesota, and South Dakota. In 2007, the company received a US$80 million grant from the U.S. Department of Energy for the creation of a cellulosic ethanol production facility in Emmetsburg, Iowa. A grand opening was held for the facility on September 3, 2014. It is expected to produce 25 million gallons of ethanol per year from corncobs, leaves and husks provided by farmers in and around the area.

POET has also collaborated with other companies, including Deere & Co. and Vermeer Company, to develop manufacturing equipment for harvesting corn cobs used in ethanol production. Among its coproducts in the process are distillers grains branded Dakota Gold, Inviz, an asphalt rejuvenator branded Jive, and a corn oil branded Voila.

History
The company traces its history to a family farm owned by Lowell Broin in Wanamingo, Minnesota, which farmed corn and livestock on 1,200 acres. In 1985, Lowell and his sons built their first ethanol plant. In 1986, it became commercial launching its flagship plant in Scotland, South Dakota in foreclosed ethanol plant under the corporate name Broin Farms which became Broin Companies.

In 2007, it was renamed POET. Then company president Jeff Broin said the new name is not an acronym. He said, “We wanted a name that would represent, rather than describe, who we are and what we do...As a poet takes everyday words and turns them into something valuable and beautiful; we use creativity that comes from common sense to leave things better than we found them.”

The reorganization changes the following company names:
Broin Companies –> Poet
Broin Management –> Poet Plant Management
Broin & Associates –> Poet Design & Construction
Ethanol Products –> Poet Ethanol Products
Dakota Gold Marketing –> Poet Nutrition
Broin Enterprises –> Poet Research Center

Its plants have been visited by President George W. Bush in Wentworth, South Dakota in April 2002, by President Barack Obama in Macon, Missouri in April 2010, and by President Joe Biden in Menlo, Iowa, in April 2022.

In 2022 POET donated over one million dollars in attempt to keep a pork processing facility from building with in the city limits of Sioux Falls SD.  Many of those hogs are fed with DDGs produced at POET facilities.

Cellulosic ethanol
POET has constructed an $8 million pilot plant to produce cellulosic ethanol made from corn cobs and other crop residue.

A commercial scale project, based on the pilot plant, was undertaken as a joint venture with Royal DSM under the name POET-DSM Advanced Biofuels, LLC. A federal loan guarantee was obtained in July, 2011 for a commercial-scale plant to be built in Emmetsburg, Iowa. This loan guarantee was later declined when the joint venture with Royal DSM was announced. Originally scheduled to open in 2013, the facility opened a year late in September, 2014. It closed down in 2020.

References

External links
POET LLC

Alcohol fuel producers
Grain companies of the United States
Companies based in Sioux Falls, South Dakota
Ethanol fuel